The sound system of New York City English is popularly known as a New York accent. The New York metropolitan accent is one of the most recognizable accents of the United States, largely due to its popular stereotypes and portrayal in radio, film, and television. Several other common names exist for the accent based on specific location, such as a Bronx accent, Long Island accent, Brooklyn accent, or North Jersey accent. The following is an overview of the phonological structures and variations within the accent.

Vowels

Consonants
While the following consonantal features are central to the common stereotype of a "New York City accent", they are not entirely ubiquitous in New York City. By contrast, the vocalic (vowel) variations in pronunciation as described above are far more typical of New York City area speakers than the consonantal features listed below, which carry a much greater stigma than do the dialect's vocalic variations:

Non-rhoticity (or r-lessness): The traditional metropolitan New York accent is non-rhotic; in other words, the sound  does not appear at the end of a syllable or immediately before a consonant. Thus, there is no  in words like park  (with the vowel rounded due to the low-back chain shift, though  in earlier twentieth-century speakers), butter , or here . However, modern New York City English is variably rhotic for the most part. The New York accent also varies between pronounced and silenced  in similar phonetic environments, even in the same word when repeated. Non-rhotic speakers usually exhibit a linking or intrusive R, similar to other non-rhotic dialect speakers.
Rhoticity: In more modern times, the post-vocal /r/ has become more prominent. When Metro New Yorkers are more conscious of what they are saying, the /r/ is more evident in their speech. In terms of social stratification, the lower class tends to use rhoticity less than the upper and middle New York City classes. Also, rhoticity is noticeably based on age since younger generations are more likely to pronounce /r/ in coda position.
Such an articulation may be used in the cluster /tr/, leading to homophones such as three and tree . With , glottalization is reported to sometimes appear in a wider range of contexts in New York City speech than in other American dialects, appearing, for example, before syllabic  (e.g., bottle ).
The universal usage of "dark L", common throughout the U.S., is also typical of the New York City accent. Newman (2014) reports  even in initial position to be relatively dark for all accents of the city except the accents of Latinos. The latter occurs initially or in initial consonant clusters, pronounced with the point or blade of the tongue against the alveolar ridge, though this variant is not as "clear" as in British Received Pronunciation. 
Also,  is reported as commonly becoming postalveolar before , making a word like William for some speakers  or even .
Vocalization of : L-vocalization is common in New York City though it is perhaps not as pervasive as in some other dialects. Like its fellow liquid , it may be vocalized when it appears finally or before a consonant (e.g.,  sell,  milk) though not when it is syllabic (e.g.,  shuttle).
Labov (1966) found this alternation to vary by class with the non-fricative forms appearing more regularly in lower and working class speech. Historical dialect documents suggest th-stopping probably originated from the massive influence of immigrant German, Italian, Irish, and Yiddish speakers to the city starting in the mid-19th century.

Variability

Social and geographic variation
Despite common references to a "Bronx accent", "Brooklyn accent", "Long Island accent", etc., which reflect a popular belief that different boroughs or neighborhoods of the New York metropolitan area have different accents, linguistic research fails to reveal any features that vary internally within the dialect due to specific geographic differences. Impressions that the dialect varies geographically are likely a byproduct of class or ethnic variation, and even some of these assumptions are losing credibility in light of accent convergences among the current younger generations of various ethnic backgrounds. Speakers from Queens born in the 1990s and later are showing a cot–caught merger more than in other boroughs, though this too is likely class- or ethnic-based (or perhaps even part of a larger trend in the whole city) rather than location-based. Increasing levels of the cot–caught merger among these Queens natives have also appeared correlated with their majority foreign parentage. A lowering of New York City's traditionally raised caught vowel is similarly taking place among younger residents of Manhattan's Lower East Side. This is seen most intensely among Western European (and Jewish) New Yorkers, fairly intensely among Latino and Asian New Yorkers, but not among African-American New Yorkers. Therefore, this reverses a trend documented amongst Western European Lower East Siders in the 20th century.

In New Jersey
Though geographic differences are not a primary factor for the internal variation of features within the dialect, the prevalence of the dialect's features as a whole can vary within the metropolitan area based on distance from the city proper, most notably in northeast Jersey, plus Middlesex and Monmouth Counties. East of the Hackensack and Passaic Rivers (closest to the city proper), the short-a split system is identical to that used in the city itself. West of the Hackensack but east of the Passaic, the New York City system's function word constraint is no longer found, and the open syllable constraint begins to vary. West of both rivers (farthest from the city proper), a completely different short-a system is found. Furthermore, New York City's closest New Jersey neighbors, like Newark, Hoboken, and Jersey City, may be non-rhotic like the city itself. However, farther away from the city, the dialect is fully rhotic nowadays in New Jersey, so the phrase "over there" may be pronounced "ovah deah"  by someone from Newark but "over dare"  by someone from Middletown Township.

Ethnic variation
The classic New York City dialect is centered on middle- and working-class European Americans, and this ethnic cluster now accounts for less than half of the city's population, within which there are degrees of ethnic variation. The variations of New York City English are a result of the waves of immigrants that have settled in the city, from the earliest settlement by the Dutch and English, followed in the 19th century by the Irish and Western Europeans (typically of French, German, and Scandinavian descent). Over time these collective influences combined to give New York City its distinctive accent.

Up until the immigration acts of 1920 and 1924 that restricted Asian as well as Southern and Eastern European immigration, many Eastern European Jewish and Italian immigrants, as well as some later immigrants, arrived and further affected the region's speech. Ongoing sociolinguistic research suggests that some differentiation between these last groups' speech may exist. Labov also discusses Irish-originating features being the most stigmatized. Still, Labov argues that these differences are relatively minor, more of degree than kind. All noted Euro-American groups share the relevant features.

One area revealing robustly unique patterns is New York City English among Orthodox Jews, overlapping with Yeshiva English, which can exist outside of the New York City metropolitan area as well. There is also substantial use of Yiddish and particularly Hebrew words.

African American Metro New Yorkers typically speak a New York variant of African-American Vernacular English (AAVE), sharing the New York City accent's raised  vowel. Many Latino New Yorkers speak a distinctly local ethnolect, New York Latino English, characterized by a varying mix of New York City English and AAVE features, along with some Spanish contact features. Asian American New Yorkers are not shown by studies to have any phonetic features that are overwhelmingly distinct.

References

Bibliography
 
 
 

 

North American English
Accent
English language in the United States
City colloquials